Ellen "Nellie" Shine (30 December 1891 – 5 March 1993) was the last living adult survivor of the  at the time of the sinking and the last living survivor of Irish background.

Early life 
Ellen "Nellie" Shine had been living in rural Ireland, near Newmarket, County Cork with her elder sister after their parents died. After her sister took in an orphaned infant, Shine was sent to the United States to live with her brother.

RMS Titanic 
Shine boarded the RMS Titanic at Queenstown as a Third-Class Passenger, to cross to the United States in order to live with her brother. There is confusion over the age of Shine when she boarded the Titanic, as sources have her being aged 20, but in a 1959 article, her husband John Callaghan was quoted as stating she was 19. In the manifest of passengers boarding in Queenstown, she is listed as a third class passenger, with the occupation of "spinster".

Before Shine boarded the ship, a local school teacher gave her a religious medal, following a local custom where the saint featured was prayed to for protection during the journey, and returned to the giver. During the sinking, the medal was lost, causing Shine to become upset, as she felt the prayers and the medal was what had saved her.

Her account, shown below, of the sinking was published in The Times (of London), The Denver Post, The Daily Times and other United States newspapers. The account slightly differs in some papers, with some continuing that the four men in the life boat were shot by officers, and their bodies thrown overboard.

Later life 
Shine married John Callaghan and moved to northern Manhattan, New York City, where she lived until her death in 1993, aged 101.

References 

RMS Titanic survivors
1993 deaths
1891 births